Akushali is a rural locality (a selo) in Kukuninsky Selsoviet, Gergebilsky District, Republic of Dagestan, Russia. The population was 55 as of 2010.

Geography 
Akushali is located 21 km west of Gergebil (the district's administrative centre) by road. Maali and Murada are the nearest rural localities.

References 

Rural localities in Gergebilsky District